Daddy is a 1992 Indian Malayalam-language  film, starring Arvind Swamy, Gouthami Tadimalla and Suresh Gopi. The film was dubbed and released in Tamil as Daddy Mummy.

Plot
Vinu and Ammu live in the same village as the Father. Father takes care of Vinu. Anand comes to the village, newly charged as Circle Inspector where he befriends Vinu and Ammu. Anand adopts Vinu eventually. Antony, an escaped convict, is the father of Vinu. Father tells Anand about how Antony became a convict after his wife's death, leaving his new born son Vinu with the Father. Anand lets him stay with Vinu until his first holy communion day. Vinu will come to know about his relationship with Antony. The day after his first holy communion day, Antony surrenders to the police, leaving Vinu with Anand and Ammu.

Cast
Arvind Swamy as Anand, Circle Inspector 
Suresh Gopi as Antony 
Gautami as Ammu
Master Sharan as Vinu
Renuka
Rajan P. Dev as Father
C. I. Paul as Constable Chacko
Augustine Sub-Inspector Philip
T. P. Madhavan

Soundtrack
Music was given by S. P. Venkatesh.

References

External links

1992 films
1990s Malayalam-language films
Films directed by Sangeeth Sivan